Orton is a surname. Notable people with the surname include:

Azariah Giles Orton (1789–1864), American Presbyterian theologian
Beth Orton, English singer-songwriter
Bill Orton (1948–2009), US Congressman from Utah
 Daniel Orton, American basketball player
Edward Orton, Sr., American geologist and first president of the Ohio State University
Edward Orton, Jr., his son, a businessman and philanthropist
Frank Orton, Swedish, national ombudsman
James Orton (1830–1877), United States naturalist (son of Azariah Giles Orton)
George Orton, first Canadian olympian and middle-distance runner
Greg Orton (disambiguation), multiple people
Joe Orton (1933–1967), English playwright
Kyle Orton, former American football player
Newell Orton (1915–1941), British flying ace of the Second World War
P. D. Orton, British mycologist
Philo A. Orton, American politician and jurist
Richard Orton (1940–2013), British academic and composer of electronic music
Samuel Orton, pioneered the study of learning disabilities. He is best known for his work examining the causes and treatment of reading disability, or dyslexia
Virginia Orton (1882–1960), vice-president of Washington State Federation of Women's Clubs
William Orton (1826–1878), president of Western Union company
A family of American professional wrestlers, consisting of:
Bob Orton (1929–2006), the family founder
His older son Bob Orton Jr. (born 1950)
His younger son Barry Orton (1958–2021)
His grandson Randy Orton (born 1980), son of Bob Jr.

English-language surnames
Surnames of Lowland Scottish origin